William O'Brien (6 March 1918 – 5 November 1994) was a Fine Gael politician from County Limerick, Ireland. He was a Senator from 1969 to 1977, and then a Teachta Dála (TD) for Limerick West from 1977 to 1987.

Before entering politics, O'Brien was an employee of CIÉ, the state-run Irish transport company.

He stood unsuccessfully as a Fine Gael candidate for Dáil Éireann in the Limerick West constituency at the 1969 and 1973 general elections before winning the seat at the 1977 general election. After his 1969 defeat, he was elected to the 12th Seanad Éireann on the Labour Panel, which returned him in 1973 to the 13th Seanad.

Once in the Dáil, O'Brien was re-elected at the 1981 general election and at both the February 1982 and November 1982 general elections. He did not contest the 1987 general election, and retired from politics.

References

1918 births
1994 deaths
Fine Gael TDs
Members of the 12th Seanad
Members of the 13th Seanad
Members of the 21st Dáil
Members of the 22nd Dáil
Members of the 23rd Dáil
Members of the 24th Dáil
Politicians from County Limerick
Local councillors in County Limerick
Fine Gael senators